Tepidisphaera is a genus of bacteria from the family of Planctomycetaceae with one known species (Tepidisphaera mucosa). Tepidisphaera mucosa has been isolated from a hot spring from the Lake Baikal in Kamchatka in Russia.

References

Bacteria genera
Monotypic bacteria genera
Planctomycetota